David McNeill (born 6 October 1986 in East Melbourne) is an Australian long-distance runner. He was selected for the Tokyo 2020 Summer Olympics, McNeill finished 8th in his heat of the Men's 5000m in a time of 13:39.97. He was therefore eliminated.

Early years 
McNeill was just 10-years-old when he started cross-country running. He had a natural ability and decided to focus on long-distance running full-time. He made his international debut in 2004 at the Commonwealth Youth (U18) Games running in the 3000m. After graduating from Xavier College in Kew Melbourne McNeill went to Northern Arizona University where he excelled. He was twice named to ESPN magazine's NCAA All-Academic First Team. In 2009 he was named the Division I Scholar-Athlete of the Year.

He is presently a member of the Old Xaverians Athletics Club.

Achievements 
At the 2012 Summer Olympics, he competed in the Men's 5000 metres, finishing 28th overall in Round 1, failing to qualify for the final.

On 2 May 2015, David ran a qualifying time of 27:45.01 to the 2015 World Championships in Athletics and Athletics at the 2016 Summer Olympics by finishing 4th at Payton Jordan Invitational 10 km.

At the 2016 Summer Olympics in Rio, David finished 16th in the 10,000m final in a time of 27:51.71.

References

External links 
 David McNeill at Athletics Australia
 
 
 
 

1986 births
Living people
Australian male long-distance runners
Olympic athletes of Australia
Athletes (track and field) at the 2012 Summer Olympics
Athletes (track and field) at the 2010 Commonwealth Games
Athletes (track and field) at the 2018 Commonwealth Games
Athletes (track and field) at the 2016 Summer Olympics
World Athletics Championships athletes for Australia
Athletes from Melbourne
People educated at Xavier College
Commonwealth Games competitors for Australia
Athletes (track and field) at the 2020 Summer Olympics
People from East Melbourne